Bert Longenecker (1876–1940) was an American cinematographer. He was active in Hollywood during the 1920s and 1930s, primarily on westerns at lower-budget Poverty Row companies including Aywon, Monogram and Republic Pictures. He frequently worked with the prolific director Robert N. Bradbury.

Filmography

 Riders of the Law (1922)
 The Forbidden Trail (1923)
 Wolf Tracks (1923)
 Gallopin' Through (1923)
 Slow as Lightning (1923)
 Desert Rider (1923)
 The Air Hawk (1924)
 Behind Two Guns (1924)
 Dynamite Dan (1924)
 $50,000 Reward (1924)
 Riders of Mystery (1925)
 The Flying Fool (1925)
 With Kit Carson Over the Great Divide (1925)
 With Buffalo Bill on the U. P. Trail (1926)
 The Fighting Doctor (1926)
 Better Days (1927)
 Circle Canyon (1933)
 Adventures of Texas Jack (1934)
 A Scream in the Night (1934)
 The Rawhide Terror (1934)
 The Fire Trap (1935)
 The Irish Gringo (1935)
 Fighting Caballero (1935)
 Between Men (1935)
 Sundown Saunders (1935)
 Custer's Last Stand (1936)
 Desert Phantom (1936)
 Brand of the Outlaws (1936)
 Last of the Warrens (1936)
 Cavalry (1936)
 The Crime Patrol (1936)
 The Law Rides (1936)
 Valley of the Lawless (1936)
 The Gun Ranger (1936)
 Lightnin' Crandall (1937)
 Doomed at Sundown (1937)
 Reckless Ranger (1937)
 Trail of Vengeance (1937)
 Riders of the Dawn (1937)
 Guns in the Dark (1937)
 Boothill Brigade (1937)
 God's Country and the Man (1937)
 The Red Rope (1937)
 The Gambling Terror (1937)
 Where Trails Divide (1937)
 Romance of the Rockies (1937)
 The Trusted Outlaw (1937)
 Gun Lords of Stirrup Basin (1937)
 A Lawman Is Born (1937)
 Danger Valley (1937)
 Stars Over Arizona (1937)
 Bar-Z Bad Men (1937)
 The Painted Trail (1938)
 The Mexicali Kid (1938)
 Gun Packer (1938)
 Man's Country (1938)
 Wanted by the Police (1938)
 Wild Horse Canyon (1938)
 Across the Plains (1939)
 Drifting Westward (1939)
 Oklahoma Terror (1939)
 Sundown on the Prairie (1939)
 Trigger Smith (1939)
 Overland Mail (1939)

References

Bibliography
 Darby, William. Masters of Lens and Light: A Checklist of Major Cinematographers and Their Feature Films. Scarecrow Press, 1991.
 Munden, Kenneth White. The American Film Institute Catalog of Motion Pictures Produced in the United States, Part 1. University of California Press, 1997.

External links

1876 births
1940 deaths
American cinematographers
People from Tumwater, Washington